Edward Thomas MacDonnell (August 9, 1886 – March 30, 1956) was an American football, basketball, and baseball coach. He served as the head football coach at Louisiana State University (LSU) from 1914 to 1916 and at Wake Forest University for one season in 1917, compiling a career college football record of 15–13–2. MacDonnell was also the head basketball coach at Wake Forest for the 1917–18 season, tallying a mark of 4–12, and the school's head baseball coach in the spring of 1918, notching a record of 9–3. MacDonald was an alumnus of Colgate University, graduating in 1910. He was a member of Phi Gamma Delta.

Head coaching record

Football

*<small>Last five games of season were coached by Irving Pray and Dana X. Bible.

References

1886 births
1956 deaths
Colgate Raiders football players
LSU Tigers football coaches
Wake Forest Demon Deacons baseball coaches
Wake Forest Demon Deacons football coaches
Wake Forest Demon Deacons men's basketball coaches
People from Hamilton, New York